The 2014 season was Viking's second full season with Kjell Jonevret as manager. They competed in the Tippeligaen and were knocked out of the cup at the Quarterfinal stage by Molde.

Squad

Transfers

Winter

In:

Out:

Summer

In:

Out:

Competitions

Tippeligaen

Table

Results summary

Results by round

Matches

Norwegian Cup

Squad statistics

Appearances and goals

|-
|colspan="14"|Players away from Viking on loan:
|-
|colspan="14"|Players who left Viking during the season:
|}

Goal scorers

Disciplinary record

References

Viking FK seasons
Viking